Copeland Creek is a stream in the U.S. state of Oregon. It is a tributary to the Rogue River. Headwaters originate west of Hillman Peak.

Copeland Creek was named after one Hiram Copeland .

References

Rivers of Oregon
Rivers of Jackson County, Oregon
Rivers of Klamath County, Oregon